Qomeshah is a village in Dorudfaraman Rural District, in the Central District of Kermanshah County, Kermanshah Province, Iran. At the 2006 census, its population was 519, divided between 104 families.

References 

Populated places in Kermanshah County